Windsor Castle, also known as Windsor, is a historic home located near Toano, James City County, Virginia. The house dates to about 1760, and is a -story, central passage plan frame dwelling. The house was expanded to its present size in the late-18th or early-19th century. It has a gable roof with dormers, sits on a brick foundation, and features exterior chimneys.  The interior has an original closed-string stair and built-in corner cupboard.

It was listed on the National Register of Historic Places in 1987.

References

External links
Windsor Castle, State Route 610, Toano, James City County, VA: 3 photos and 2 data pages at Historic American Buildings Survey

Historic American Buildings Survey in Virginia
Houses on the National Register of Historic Places in Virginia
Houses completed in 1760
Houses in James City County, Virginia
National Register of Historic Places in James City County, Virginia